Matthew "Matt" Horth (born May 3, 1989 in Cleveland, Ohio) is an American soccer player who last played for Atlanta Silverbacks. He is currently the head coach of the Gordon College Fighting Scots.

Career

College and amateur
Horth grew up in Akron, Ohio, attended Cuyahoga Valley Christian Academy, and played four years of college soccer at Gordon College. He scored 15 goals in his first 18 college games in his freshman year, being named 2007 TCCC Rookie of the Year and to the TCCC First Team All-Conference. He was a TCCC First Team All-Conference selection as a freshman in 2007, a sophomore in 2008, a junior in 2009, and a senior in 2010. Horth was also a NSCAA All-New England selection in 2008, 2009, and 2010.

During his college years he played in the USL Premier Development League for the Southern California Seahorses, the Cleveland Internationals, and the Cape Cod Crusaders.

Professional
Horth turned professional in 2011 when he signed with Atlanta Silverbacks of the North American Soccer League. He made his professional debut, and scored his first professional goal, on April 9, 2011 in a game against the NSC Minnesota Stars. Horth earned his first league honors on July 18, 2011, winning the NASL Offensive Player of the Week. Atlanta announced on November 8, 2011 that Horth would return for the 2012 season.

In a game against the Carolina Railhawks on July 3, 2012, Horth made history by becoming the first player to score a goal under the professional coaching career of U.S. soccer legend Eric Wynalda.

On January 25, 2013, Horth signed with the New England Revolution.

Horth was released by the Revolution in December 2013. He initially re-signed with Atlanta Silverbacks on January 20, 2014. However, the Silverbacks soon reached an agreement with Icelandic club Leiknir Reykjavík for Horth's signature.

On January 14, 2015, Horth returned to Atlanta Silverbacks.

Honors

Individual
 Atlanta Silverbacks
 NASL Player of the Month: September 2012
 NASL Player of the Week: Week 22, 2012
 NASL Player of the Week: July 18, 2011

References

External links

1989 births
Living people
American soccer players
Cape Cod Crusaders players
Southern California Seahorses players
Cleveland Internationals players
Atlanta Silverbacks players
New England Revolution players
Rochester New York FC players
USL League Two players
North American Soccer League players
USL Championship players
Association football forwards